Eric Bach is an American computer scientist who has made contributions to computational number theory.

Bach completed his undergraduate studies at the University of Michigan, Ann Arbor, and got his Ph.D. in computer science from the University of California, Berkeley, in 1984  under the supervision of Manuel Blum. He is currently a professor at the Computer Science Department, University of Wisconsin–Madison.

Among other work, he gave explicit bounds for the Chebotarev density theorem, which imply that if one assumes the generalized Riemann hypothesis then   is generated by its elements smaller than  2(log n)2. This result shows that the generalized Riemann hypothesis implies tight bounds for the necessary run-time of the deterministic version of the Miller–Rabin primality test. Bach also did some of the first work on pinning down the actual expected run-time of the Pollard rho method where previous work relied on heuristic estimates and empirical data. He is the namesake of Bach's algorithm for generating random factored numbers.

References

American computer scientists
Living people
University of Michigan alumni
UC Berkeley College of Engineering alumni
University of Wisconsin–Madison faculty
Year of birth missing (living people)
Number theorists